The Cincinnati Reds are a Major League Baseball (MLB) franchise based in Cincinnati, Ohio. They play in the National League Central division. Officially known as the "First-Year Player Draft", the Rule 4 Draft is MLB's primary mechanism for assigning players from high schools, colleges, and other amateur clubs to its franchises. The draft order is determined based on the previous season's standings, with the team possessing the worst record receiving the first pick. In addition, teams which lost free agents in the previous off-season may be awarded compensatory or supplementary picks. Since the establishment of the draft in 1965, the Reds have selected 59 players in the first round.

Of those 59 players, 28 have been pitchers, the most of any position; 22 of these were right-handed, while 6 were left-handed. The Reds have also selected 13 outfielders, eight shortstops, four catchers, four third basemen and two first basemen. They have never selected a second baseman in the initial round of the draft. The franchise has drafted eleven players from colleges or high schools in California, while another eight were drafted out of Texas. The only first-round pick out of the Reds' home state of Ohio was Barry Larkin, a native of Cincinnati.

Five of these picks have won a World Series championship with the Reds. Don Gullett & Gary Nolan won two consecutive Series with the Reds, 1975 and 1976, and Gullett won again in 1977 as a member of the New York Yankees. Three of the Reds first-round picks participated in the team's 1990 championship: Larkin, Scott Scudder, and Jack Armstrong. In addition to eventually reaching the Hall of Fame, Larkin was awarded the Roberto Clemente Award in 1993, the Lou Gehrig Memorial Award in 1994, and named the National League Most Valuable Player in 1995.

Cincinnati has made ten selections in the supplemental round of the draft, but has never held the first overall pick. They have also had two compensatory picks since the first draft in 1965. These additional picks are provided when a team loses a particularly valuable free agent in the previous off-season, or, more recently, if a team fails to sign a draft pick from the previous year. The Reds have failed to sign their first-round pick twice.  Mike Miley, selected in 1971, chose to attend college at Louisiana State University; he would later be drafted by the California Angels in 1974. The Reds did not receive a compensatory pick for failing to sign Miley.  Jeremy Sowers, the Reds' 2001 choice, decided to attend Vanderbilt University, and was selected in the first round of the 2004 draft by the Cleveland Indians.  Sowers' MLB debut came in 2006 against Cincinnati. For failing to sign Sowers, the Reds received the 40th pick in the 2002 draft, which they used to select Mark Schramek.

Key

Picks

See also
Cincinnati Reds minor league players

Footnotes
 Through the 2012 draft, free agents were evaluated by the Elias Sports Bureau and rated "Type A", "Type B", or not compensation-eligible. If a team offered arbitration to a player but that player refused and subsequently signed with another team, the original team was able to receive additional draft picks. If a "Type A" free agent left in this way, his previous team received a supplemental pick and a compensatory pick from the team with which he signed. If a "Type B" free agent left in this way, his previous team received only a supplemental pick. Since the 2013 draft, free agents are no longer classified by type; instead, compensatory picks are only awarded if the team offered its free agent a contract worth at least the average of the 125 current richest MLB contracts. However, if the free agent's last team acquired the player in a trade during the last year of his contract, it is ineligible to receive compensatory picks for that player.
 The Reds gained a compensatory first-round pick in 1979 from the Philadelphia Phillies for losing free agent Pete Rose.
 The Reds lost their first-round pick in 1981 to the Chicago Cubs as compensation for signing free agent Larry Biittner.
 The Reds gained a compensatory first-round pick in 1982 from the New York Yankees for losing free agent Dave Collins.
 The Reds gained a supplemental first-round pick in 1982 for losing free agent Dave Collins.
 The Reds lost their first-round pick in 1988 to the San Francisco Giants as compensation for signing free agent Eddie Milner.
 The Reds gained a supplemental first-round pick in 1993 for losing free agent Greg Swindell.  They had lost their original first-round pick in 1993 to the Minnesota Twins as compensation for signing free agent John Smiley.
 The Reds lost their first-round pick in 1995 to the Boston Red Sox as compensation for signing free agent Damon Berryhill.
 The Reds gained a supplemental first-round pick in 1996 for losing free agent Ron Gant.
  The Reds gained a supplemental first-round pick in 2000 for losing free agent Juan Guzmán.
 The Reds gained a supplemental first-round pick in 2002 for failing to sign 2001 first-round pick Jeremy Sowers.
 The Reds gained a supplemental first-round pick in 2007 for losing free agent Rich Aurilia.
 The Reds gained a supplemental first-round pick in 2007 for losing free agent Scott Schoeneweis.
 The Reds gained a supplemental first-round pick in 2009 for losing free agent Jeremy Affeldt.
 The Reds gained a supplemental first-round pick in 2012 for losing free agent Ramón Hernández.
 The Reds gained a supplemental first-round pick in 2012 for losing free agent Francisco Cordero.
 The Reds gained a compensatory first-round pick in 2014 for losing free agent Shin-Soo Choo.

References
General references

In-text citations

External links
Cincinnati Reds official website

First-round draft picks
Cincinnati Reds first-round draft picks